Dr. William Halliday Welsh (1879-1972) was a Scotland international rugby union player. He became the 58th President of the Scottish Rugby Union.

Rugby Union career

Amateur career

Welsh played for Edinburgh University. He was part of a famous University back line in 1901–02 season: Alec Boswell Timms, James Barnett Allison (of Ireland), and Alfred Fell together with Welsh and Alexander William Duncan at Full Back. The half back pairing of Ernest Simson and Frank Fasson completed the international line-up of backs.

For 4 straight seasons, the Edinburgh University side had won the Scottish Unofficial Championship from 1899 to 1903, albeit in 3 of those seasons they shared the title with Edinburgh Academicals and Hawick (1899–1900), Watsonians (1901–02), and Glasgow Academicals (1902–03). The 1900–01 season championship was won outright by the University.

He also played for Merchistonians.

Provincial career

He played for Edinburgh District in 1900.

He played for the Cities District in 1901.

International career

He was capped 8 times for Scotland in the period 1900–02.

The Scottish Referee included this biography of Welsh in the buildup to the Scotland versus Wales match in 1901: '[Welsh] is one of the best athletes Merchiston and Scotland have produced. Three-Quarter mile champion of Scotland and at present the holder of all three short distance championships. One of the fastest men who ever played for Scotland, perhaps only equalled by W. A. Peterkin and George Campbell Lindsay. A splendid tackler, and a fine kicker with either foot. A strong, determined runner, but a little lacking in dodging ability. Combines splendidly with Alec Boswell Timms. Capped against Ireland and England last year. Saved Scotland last year from defeat by England by his great tackling of William Bunting and Forrest when clean away.'

Administrative career

He was President of the Scottish Rugby Union for the period 1938 to 1939.

After being President, Welsh was elected as a Special Representative on the board of the SRU.

References

1879 births
1972 deaths
Rugby union players from Edinburgh
Scottish rugby union players
Scotland international rugby union players
Edinburgh District (rugby union) players
Merchistonian FC players
Cities District players
Edinburgh University RFC players
Presidents of the Scottish Rugby Union
Rugby union wings